Peter Andrews may refer to:
 Peter B. Andrews (born 1937), American mathematician  
 Peter Andrews (agricultural pioneer), Australian environmentalist  
 Peter Andrews (footballer) (1845–1916), Scottish international footballer
 Peter Andrews (scientist), Australian scientist
 Peter Andrews (cinematographer), a pseudonym used by American film director Steven Soderbergh (born 1963) when serving as his own Director of Photography
 Pop Andrews (Peter Andrews, fl. 1905–1914), American baseball player